Michael Stoschek (born 1947/1948) is a German billionaire businessman, chairman of Brose Fahrzeugteile, the German car parts company founded by his grandfather Max Brose, a Wehrwirtschaftsführer in Nazi Germany.

Early life
Michael Stoschek was born in Germany. He was educated at Casimirianum Coburg.

Career
Stoschek took charge of Brose Fahrzeugteile in 1971 aged only 23 and grew the company into an international company.

As of November 2015, Forbes estimated his net worth at US$2.4 billion.

Max Brose Controversy 
Stochek's grandfather Max Brose employed prisoners-of-war as slave laborers in his factory during World War II. At the end of the war he was tried and convicted as a Mitläufer.

Stoschek has been criticized for his attempt to rehabilitate Brose's image. In 2008 Stoschek used company money to hire the historian Gregor Schöllgen to write an unsubstantiated biography on Brose's life and the history of the firm, downplaying his association with the Nazi Party. Stoschek also withheld funds from the Christian Social Union, a political party in Coburg, until they agreed to name a street after Brose. Laws written in the denazifaction process prohibit streets from being named after Nazis.

Personal life
He is married with two children. His daughter Julia Stoschek is an art collector, specializing time-based media art, and runs the Julia Stoschek Collection in Düsseldorf, which opened in 2007, and has two floors of exhibition space, over 2500 m2. He has a son Maximilian Stoschek.

References 

1948 births
Living people
German billionaires
Businesspeople from Bavaria
20th-century German businesspeople
21st-century German businesspeople
People from Coburg